Intolerance may refer to:

 Hypersensitivity or intolerance, undesirable reactions produced by the immune system
 Intolerance (film), a 1916 film by D. W. Griffith
 Intolerance (album), the first solo album from Grant Hart, formerly of the band Hüsker Dü
 Intolerance, a 1984 album by Tik & Tok
 "Intolerance", a song from Undertow (Tool album) by the band Tool

See also
 Tolerance (disambiguation)